Hazel Dell is a hamlet in the Canadian province of Saskatchewan.

Demographics 

References

Designated places in Saskatchewan
Hazel Dell No. 335, Saskatchewan
Organized hamlets in Saskatchewan
Division No. 9, Saskatchewan